Kampong Kuala Lurah (or simply Kuala Lurah) is a village in the south-west of Brunei-Muara District, Brunei, immediately adjacent to the Brunei-Malaysia border. The population was 798 in 2016. It serves as the vehicular entry point to mainland part of the country from Limbang District in the Malaysian state of Sarawak.

It is one of the villages within Mukim Pengkalan Batu. The postcode is BH1923.

References 

Kuala Lurah
Brunei–Malaysia border crossings